Casa Babylon is the fourth and final studio album by Mano Negra, released in 1994.

Track listing

Personnel

Mano Negra
 Manu Chao – lead vocals, guitar
 Antoine Chao – trumpet, vocals
 Santiago Casariego – drums, vocals
 Philippe Teboul – percussion, vocals
 Daniel Jamet – lead guitar, vocals
 Joseph Dahan – bass guitar, vocals
 Thomas Darnal – keyboards, vocals
 Pierre "Krøpöl" Gauthé – trumpet, vocals
 Fidel Nadal – vocals

Guest musicians
 Anouk – vocals
 Ana – vocals
 Rocio – vocals
 Djerba – vocals
 Abraham – vocals
 Jhonder – vocals
 Carlos de Nicaragua – vocals
 Napo Romero – vocals
 Matéo Van Vliet – vocals
 Jello Biafra – vocals
 Les Moskokids – vocals
 Tempo – bass guitar (9)

Charts

Certifications

References

External links
 

1994 albums
Mano Negra (band) albums